Zanardi (surname), Italian surname
 Zanardi (comics), comics character
 Via Zanardi 33, Italian television series